Alekos Chatzistavridis (1 January 1915 – 1 January 1998) was a Greek footballer who played as a forward and a later manager. His real name was "Stavridis".

Club career

Chatzistavridis started football at Vyzantion Piraeus. In 1933 he joined AEK Athens and changed his name to "Chatzistavridis", because he officially belonged to his previous club. He established himself as one of the main attackers of the club. On 28 May 1939, he opened the score in the Greek Cup final, defeating PAOK by 2–1. He played with the "yellow-blacks" for a decade and won 2 consecutive Panhellenic Championships, 1 Cup and 1 Athens FCA Championship in 1940, including the first domestic double in by a Greek club in 1939.

In 1944, during the period of the Occupation, when Greek football was inactive and Chatzistavridis joined Olympiacos. On 30 June 1946 he was expelled in the match against AEK alongside his former teammate Kleanthis Maropoulos. On 8 June 1947, he played in the 5–0 win against Iraklis in the Cup final. He played as a regular at the club of Piraeus, until 1949, when he ended his career as a footballer. At Olympiacos he won in total another 2 consecutive Panhellenic Championships, 1 Cup and 4 consecutive Piraeus FCA Championships, including another domestic double in by a Greek club in 1947.

International career
Chatzistavridis played in two games with Greece under Kostas Negrepontis, for the Mediterranean Cup in May 1949 both held at Leoforos Alexandras Stadium. His debut was on 16 May in the 1–2 defeat against Turkey, coming in as a sub at the 46th minute in the place of Giannis Petsanas. He scored his only international goal in his second and final appearance on 18 May, playing the full match in the 1–3 defeat against Egypt.

Managerial career
Immeditately after his retirement as a footballer, Chatzistavridis enacted with coaching at Pampaianikos Peanias until 1952. Afterwards, he took as various clubs such as Egaleo, AE Nikea, Olympiacos for 6 months and a brief spell at Proodeftiki.

Personal life
Chatzistavridis fought in the World War II and in the battle of Tepeleni and was seriously injured in the leg, where he recovered after great efforts. He died in 1998 at Piraeus.

Honours

AEK Athens
Panhellenic Championship: 1938–39, 1939–40
Greek Cup: 1938–39
Athens FCA League: 1940

Olympiacos
Panhellenic Championship: 1946–47, 1947–48
Greek Cup: 1946–47
Piraeus FCA League: 1946, 1947, 1948, 1949

References

External links

"The History of Olympiacos", Publications "G.X. Alexandris", Athens 1996
"The History of AEK", Publications "G.X. Alexandris", Athens 1996
"Legend, a journey through time", "Heliotropio" Publications, Athens 1997, ISBN 569-584-365-2
"Golden Legend", "Art Press" Publications, Athens 1997
"National Greece, march through time", "Papazisis" Publications, Athens 2001,
80 years, 80 forms, Greek Letters Publications, ISBN 960-442-021-6

1915 births
1998 deaths
Footballers from Istanbul
Constantinopolitan Greeks
Emigrants from the Ottoman Empire to Greece
Greek footballers
Greece international footballers
Association football forwards
AEK Athens F.C. players
Olympiacos F.C. players
Greek football managers
Egaleo F.C. managers
Olympiacos F.C. managers
Proodeftiki F.C. managers